Naxalbari uprising was an armed peasant revolt in 1967 in the Naxalbari block of Siliguri subdivision in Darjeeling district, West Bengal, India. It was mainly led by tribals and the radical communists leaders of Bengal and further developed into the Communist Party of India (Marxist–Leninist) in 1969. The armed struggle became an inspiration to the naxalite movement which rapidly spread from West Bengal to other states of India creating division within the CPI(M) Party.

Origins 

The uprising occurred during the height Sino-Soviet split, which was causing turmoil within the communist organisations in India and the rest of the world. The leader and ideologue of the uprising Charu Majumdar theorised that the situation was appropriate for launching an armed People's war in India following the Chinese Revolution (1949), Vietnam War and Cuban Revolution. Charu Majumdar wrote the Historic Eight Documents which became the foundation of the Naxalite movement in 1967.

Timeline 
The communists in 1965-66 already controlled territory in the Naxalbari region. The so-called "Siliguri group" called for initiating an armed struggle, which started the uprising. Many peasant cells were created throughout the region. On 3 March 1967 just a day after the united front had sworn in ministers in West Bengal, some 150 peasants armed with bows and spears, took 300 maunds of paddy or around 11000 kg of paddy and started seizing land. The peasants were enraged that the CPI(M) did not retain workers in the party. By 18 March the peasants started seizing land from jotedars (landlords who owned large plots of land in the region). Peasant committees were set up throughout the region within four months. The first clash occurred between the peasants and landlords when a share-cropper, Bigul Kisan, was beaten up by landlord gentries. Following this, peasant committees seized land, foodgrains and arms from the landlord gentries, leading to violent clashes. The government started mobilizing the police forces to deal with the uprising. 

The inspector of Jharugaon village was killed by peasant committee members. In retaliation, the police opened fire which resulted in the death of nine women and one child on 25 May 1967. By June the peasant committees gained hold in the regions around Naxalbari, Kharibari and Phansidewa seizing lands, ammunition and food grains from the jotedars. The tea garden worker around the Darjeeling region participated in strikes supporting the peasant committees. The upheaval sustained till 19 July when the paramilitary forces were sent by the government. Leaders like Jangal Santhal were arrested. Some of them like Charu Majumdar went underground. And others like Tribheni Kanu, Sobham, Ali Gorkha Majhi, and Tilka Majhi were killed.

Recognition and aftermath 

The uprising got support from the Communist Party of China simultaneously deteriorating the relation of the later with the Communist Party of India (Marxist). The CPI(M) expelled many of its members who supported the uprising. Charu Majumdar, Souren Bose, Mahadeb Mukherjee and Dilip Bagchi were expelled on the same day. Expelled communists later on organised themselves into one organisation (AICCCR) further developing into the CPI(ML). CPI(ML) remained the centre of the Naxalite movement till 1975. A large number of enthusiastic youth joined the movement. Although the uprising was suppressed, it remained a landmark in Indian politics which further lead to several other similar kind of movements in parts of Bihar and originated the ongoing Naxalite–Maoist insurgency.

See also 
 Kucheipadar tribal movement
 1970 Bhojpur uprising
 Lal Sena
 Naxalite
 Srikakulam peasant uprising

References

Communist rebellions
Land rights movements
Naxalite–Maoist insurgency
Peasant revolts
Political uprisings in India
Rebellions in India
Riots and civil disorder in India
1967 in Indian politics